The Northern Hemisphere is the half of Earth that is north of the Equator. For other planets in the Solar System, north is defined as being in the same celestial hemisphere relative to the invariable plane of the Solar System as Earth's North Pole.

Due to Earth's axial tilt of 23.439281°, winter in the Northern Hemisphere lasts from the December solstice (typically December 21 UTC) to the March equinox (typically March 20 UTC), while summer lasts from the June solstice through to the September equinox (typically on 23 September UTC). The dates vary each year due to the difference between the calendar year and the astronomical year. Within the Northern Hemisphere, oceanic currents can change the weather patterns that affect many factors within the north coast. Such events include El Niño–Southern Oscillation.

Trade winds blow from east to west just above the equator. The winds pull surface water with them, creating currents, which flow westward due to the Coriolis effect. The currents then bend to the right, heading north. At about 30 degrees north latitude, a different set of winds, the westerlies, push the currents back to the east, producing a closed clockwise loop.

Its surface is 60.7% water, compared with 80.9% water in the case of the Southern Hemisphere, and it contains 67.3% of Earth's land. Europe and North America are entirely on Earth's Northern Hemisphere.

Geography and climate

During the 2.5 million years of the Pleistocene, numerous cold phases called glacials (Quaternary ice age), or significant advances of continental ice sheets, in Europe and North America, occurred at intervals of approximately 40,000 to 100,000 years. The long glacial periods were separated by more temperate and shorter interglacials which lasted about 10,000–15,000 years. The last cold episode of the last glacial period ended about 10,000 years ago. Earth is currently in an interglacial period of the Quaternary, called the Holocene. The glaciations that occurred during the glacial period covered many areas of the Northern Hemisphere.

The Arctic is a region around the North Pole (90° latitude). Its climate is characterized by cold winters and cool summers. Precipitation mostly comes in the form of snow. Areas inside the Arctic Circle (66°34′ latitude) experience some days in summer when the Sun never sets, and some days during the winter when it never rises. The duration of these phases varies from one day for locations right on the Arctic Circle to several months near the Pole, which is the middle of the Northern Hemisphere.

Between the Arctic Circle and the Tropic of Cancer (23°26′ latitude) lies the Northern temperate zone. The changes in these regions between summer and winter are generally mild, rather than extreme hot or cold. However, a temperate climate can have very unpredictable weather.

Tropical regions (between the Tropic of Cancer and the Equator, 0° latitude) are generally hot all year round and tend to experience a rainy season during the summer months, and a dry season during the winter months.

In the Northern Hemisphere, objects moving across or above the surface of the Earth tend to turn to the right because of the Coriolis effect. As a result, large-scale horizontal flows of air or water tend to form clockwise-turning gyres. These are best seen in ocean circulation patterns in the North Atlantic and North Pacific oceans. Within the Northern Hemisphere, oceanic currents can change the weather patterns that affect many factors within the north coast; such as El Niño. 

For the same reason, flows of air down toward the northern surface of the Earth tend to spread across the surface in a clockwise pattern. Thus, clockwise air circulation is characteristic of high pressure weather cells in the Northern Hemisphere. Conversely, air rising from the northern surface of the Earth (creating a region of low pressure) tends to draw air toward it in a counterclockwise pattern. Hurricanes and tropical storms (massive low-pressure systems) spin counterclockwise in the Northern Hemisphere.

The shadow of a sundial moves clockwise on latitudes north of the subsolar point and anticlockwise to the south. During the day at these latitudes, the Sun tends to rise to its maximum at a southerly position. Between the Tropic of Cancer and the Equator, the sun can be seen to the north, directly overhead, or to the south at noon, dependent on the time of year. In the Southern Hemisphere, the midday Sun is predominantly in the north.

When viewed from the Northern Hemisphere, the Moon appears inverted compared to a view from the Southern Hemisphere. The North Pole faces away from the galactic center of the Milky Way. This results in the Milky Way being sparser and dimmer in the Northern Hemisphere compared to the Southern Hemisphere, making the Northern Hemisphere more suitable for deep-space observation, as it is not "blinded" by the Milky Way.

Demographics
As of 2015, the Northern Hemisphere is home to approximately 6.4 billion people which is around 87.0% of the earth's total human population of 7.3 billion people.

List of Continents, countries or territories, and oceans in the Northern Hemisphere

See also
 Southern Hemisphere
 Hemispheres of Earth
 Africa
 Asia
 Americas
 Europe
 Arctic Ocean
 Atlantic Ocean
 Indian Ocean
 Pacific Ocean
 North–South divide (disambiguation)
 Global North

Notes

References

External links

 
Hemispheres of Earth